Rehane Yavar Dhala née Rehane Khaleeli (born 27 January 1969), best known as REHANE, is a fashion designer from Chennai, India and known for her mélange of modern Indian sensibilities with a strong sense of European haute couture and ready-to-wear fashion.

Rehane's flagship store is in Chennai, with selected outlets across the globe: Evoluzione in Bangalore, Kimaya in Mumbai and Dubai, Indomix in New York City, Chubara in Washington, D.C. and Strip in Hyderabad. She regularly showcases her designs at Wills Lifestyle India Fashion Week in New Delhi and Lakme Fashion Week in Mumbai.

References

External links 
 Official Website
 TV Interview with Rehane
 TV interview with Rehane on Cochin, the next fashion hub

Indian women fashion designers
1969 births
Living people
Artists from Chennai
Women artists from Tamil Nadu